Dobroești is a commune in the east of Ilfov County, Muntenia, Romania, right off the limits of Bucharest's Sector 2. It is composed of two villages, Dobroești and Fundeni. The name Dobroești is derived from South Slavic/Bulgarian "Dobro" (good) and Romanian suffix -ești. A modern shopping and apartment complex, for overseas Chinese, have been built in Dobroești, dubbed as Chinatown.

Natives
 Aurel Beldeanu

References

Communes in Ilfov County
Localities in Muntenia